The Old Administration Building at Bryce Canyon National Park, Utah, U.S.A., also known as the Bryce Canyon Nature Museum, was the first National Park Service building built within the park.  Located near Sunrise Point in a heavily used portion of the park, the building was designed by the National Park Service Branch of Plans and Designs in the National Park Service Rustic style preferred at the time for park structures. It is in the immediate vicinity of the Bryce Inn.

The Administration Building was built in 1933 in logs on a stone foundation. The T-shaped 1-1/2 story building was built in two phases. The first phase was the large public room in the eastern portion of the building. The addition contained Park Service office space.

References

External links

 at the National Park Service's NRHP database

Government buildings completed in 1933
National Register of Historic Places in Bryce Canyon National Park
Park buildings and structures on the National Register of Historic Places in Utah
National Park Service rustic in Utah
National Register of Historic Places in Garfield County, Utah
1933 establishments in Utah